William Barnes (1801–1886) was an English writer, poet, minister, and philologist.

William or Bill Barnes may also refer to:

Sports
 William Barnes (boxer), Irish Olympic boxer
 William F. Barnes (1917–2009), American football coach
 William Barnes (sport shooter) (1876–1925), Canadian Olympic sport shooter
 Bill Barnes (pitcher) (1919–1996), Negro league baseball player
 Bill Barnes (center fielder) (William H. Barnes, 1858–1945), baseball player
 Billy Barnes (cricketer) (1852–1899), English cricketer
 Bill Barnes (footballer) (born 1939), Scottish footballer

Politicians
William Barnes (died 1558), MP for East Grinstead, Marlborough, Taunton and Downton
William Barnes (died 1559), MP for Wigan
William Barnes (labour leader) (1827–1918), New Zealand blacksmith and labour reformer
William D. Barnes (1856–1927), New York politician
William D. Barnes (Florida), Florida Comptroller
William H. Barnes (jurist) (1843–1904), Illinois politician and Arizona Territorial judge
William H. Barnes (Wisconsin politician) (1885–1973), Wisconsin politician
William Barnes Jr. (1866–1930), American journalist and politician
William Barnes Sr. (1824–1913), American attorney and Republican Party leader
William G. Barnes, American politician, Democratic candidate in the 2010 United States Senate election in Alabama

Others
 William Barnes, lead singer of American rock band Car Seat Headrest
 James William Barnes Steveni (1859–1944), British correspondent in Russia
 William H. Barnes (Medal of Honor) (c. 1840–1866), Union Army soldier
 William Sullivan Barnes (1841–1912), Canadian Unitarian minister
 William Thomas Barnes (1894–1920), English flying ace of World War I
 William Barnes (entomologist) (1860–1930), American physician, butterfly, and moth collector
 William Emery Barnes, English Anglican theologian

See also
 William Barnes Rhodes (1772–1826), English dramatist
 Ernest Barnes (1874–1953), English mathematician and scientist
 Billy Barnes (disambiguation)
 William Barne (disambiguation)